Neoscardovia arbecensis is a Gram-positive bacterial species, named as a new member of the family Bifidobacteriaceae, which already contained the genus Scardovia. It was isolated from pig slurries in the Spanish village of Arbeca as part of experiments identifying how feces cause water pollution. This species has also been isolated from farms producing traditional Iranian butter, capable of high cholesterol reduction while withstanding bile acids during digestion.

N. arbecensis is an anaerobic and mesophilic species, growing at 37°C, and its genome has 57% GC-content.

References

External links 

 Type strain of Neoscardovia arbecensis at BacDive -  the Bacterial Diversity Metadatabase

Bifidobacteriales
Bacteria described in 2015